Dale Yakiwchuk (born October 17, 1958) is a Canadian former professional ice hockey forward.  He was drafted in the second round, 30th overall, by the Montreal Canadiens in the 1978 NHL Amateur Draft; however, he never played in the National Hockey League.  He played four games in the World Hockey Association with the Winnipeg Jets during the 1978–79 season, going scoreless.

Career statistics

External links

1958 births
Baltimore Clippers (1979–81) players
Canadian ice hockey forwards
Canadian people of Ukrainian descent
Cincinnati Stingers (CHL) players
Ice hockey people from Alberta
Kalamazoo Wings (1974–2000) players
Lethbridge Broncos players
Milwaukee Admirals (IHL) players
Montreal Canadiens draft picks
Nova Scotia Voyageurs players
People from Cardston
Philadelphia Firebirds (AHL) players
Portland Winterhawks players
Living people
Taber Golden Suns players
Tulsa Oilers (1964–1984) players
Winnipeg Jets (WHA) players
Canadian expatriate ice hockey players in the United States